The 2016/17 NTFL season was the 96th season of the Northern Territory Football League (NTFL).

The first four games in Round 1 were played on Saturday, 8 October 2016, and the Grand Final was played on Saturday 18 March 2017, with the St Marys Saints defeating Wanderers Eagles by 54 points to win their 32nd premiership title (The most titles in NTFL history).

Ladder

Source: NTFL

 Rules: 1) points; 2) percentage; 3) number of points for.

Finals

Grand Final

Women's Premier League
The Women's Premier League for 2016/17 season was won by the Darwin Buffettes having a 18-point win over Waratah.

Ladder

Finals

References

Northern Territory Football League seasons
NTFL